Northeast High School is a senior high school in unincorporated northeastern Anne Arundel County, Maryland, United States. The school opened in 1964 and serves as one of two high schools for the "Census-designated Place" (CDP) of Pasadena. which is an unincorporated suburban residential area and community  (unofficial town) 15 miles south of  Baltimore. The school is situated in Pasadena's eastern coastal area community known as Riveria Beach along the south and west shores of the outer Patapsco River / Baltimore Harbor and Seaport where it flows into the Chesapeake Bay on its western shore.

The school newsletter is called the "Eaglegram" and the school newspaper is called the "Eagle's Revenge".

It opened in 1964. In 1992 and from 2012 to 2014 the building was refurbished.

Notable alumni 
Glynn Davis, baseball player

References

External links
 North East High School

Pasadena, Maryland
Public high schools in Maryland
Schools in Anne Arundel County, Maryland
Educational institutions established in 1964
1964 establishments in Maryland